Lambley Footbridge is a wooden bridge across the River South Tyne at Lambley in Northumberland.

History
The present wooden structure replaces an old derelict footbridge which was attached to the viaduct above, but was no longer maintained after British Rail closed the Alston line. The new footbridge was completed in 1992.

References

Bridges in Northumberland
Crossings of the River Tyne